Lepiota cortinarius is a species of fungus belonging to the family Agaricaceae.

It is native to Europe and Northern America.

References

cortinarius